Three Songs on a Trip to the United States is the fourth album by the experimental rock band Red Krayola, released in 1983 by Pure Freude. The album was adopted by Drag City and re-issued on CD in 1997.The album cover photos were provided by previous member Frederick Barthelme.

Critical reception
Alternative Rock singled out the album, writing: "Essentially an EP, the set peaks across its second side and a hefty live slab of stripped-down psychedelics." Rock: The Rough Guide called it "highly recommended."

Track listing

Personnel 

Red Krayola
Jesse Chamberlain – drums
Allen Ravenstine – keyboards
Mayo Thompson – guitar, vocals

Additional musicians and production
Jon Caffery – production, mixing

References

External links 
 

1983 albums
Drag City (record label) albums
1983 live albums
Red Krayola albums